Edwin or often capitalized, EDWIN, is a Japanese clothing brand founded in 1947 as 'Tsunemi Yonehachi shop'. Edwin Co. Ltd., (株式会社エドウイン) mainly focuses on jeans manufacture.

Their most popular line of clothing is the 503 jeans model which was first sold in 1997. Actor Brad Pitt has been an official spokesman and model for the brand, appearing in many of its advertisements in the past. The company has flagship concept stores in Japan in Harajuku, Tokyo and Minami-Horie, Osaka.

History
Established in Tokyo, Japan, in 1947, the EDWIN brand is known for its authenticity, innovation and craftsmanship. Founder Tsunemi Yonehachi was amongst the first merchants to bring vintage American jeans to Japan in the postwar era, setting off a national obsession with denim.

In 1961, inspired by a growing demand, EDWIN (whose company name comes from a creative rearrangement of the letters found in the word "denim") debuted the first made-in-Japan jeans.

By the 1970s, EDWIN had established itself as a pioneer in denim manufacturing, experimenting with wash techniques in the EDWIN Wash House that impacted denim wash processes around the globe. Innovations included ONE WASH, a prewash process to eliminate shrinkage prior to purchase, and OLD WASH, a precursor to stone wash that reproduces faded colors through careful abrasion techniques for a lived-in denim look.

Today, EDWIN continues to set the gold standard in Japanese denim production, priding itself on the use of exclusive fabrics, revolutionary production technologies, state-of-the-art finishing and advancements in design and fit.

Owned Brands 
 EDWIN

 SOMETHING

C17

Ladiva by EDWIN

Licensed Brands 
Lee (jeans)

Wrangler (jeans)

Alpha Industries

Maui and Sons

References

External links
 EDWIN Official site
 EDWIN EUROPE EDWIN USA
 
 
 
 

Clothing companies of Japan
Clothing brands of Japan
Jeans by brand
Itochu
Japanese companies established in 1969
Manufacturing companies based in Tokyo
Retail companies based in Tokyo